Petrus "Piet" Gerardus Ikelaar (2 January 1896, in Nieuwer Amstel – 25 November 1992, in Zaandam) was a track cyclist from the Netherlands. He represented the Netherlands at the 1920 Summer Olympics. At his first appearance he won bronze medals in the 50 km track race and the 2000m tandem competition, alongside Frans de Vreng.

See also
 List of Dutch Olympic cyclists

References

External links
 Dutch Olympic Committee 

1896 births
1992 deaths
Dutch male cyclists
Olympic cyclists of the Netherlands
Cyclists at the 1920 Summer Olympics
Olympic bronze medalists for the Netherlands
Sportspeople from Amstelveen
Olympic medalists in cycling
Medalists at the 1920 Summer Olympics
Cyclists from North Holland